

List of Towns in Ghana 

Esumeja is a town in the Ashanti Region of Ghana.

References 

Ashanti Region
Communities in Ghana